Helastia farinata is a moth of the family Geometridae. This species is endemic to New Zealand. It was first described by William Warren in 1896 and originally named Xanthorhoe farinata.

References

Moths of New Zealand
Endemic fauna of New Zealand
Moths described in 1896
Taxa named by William Warren (entomologist)
Cidariini
Endemic moths of New Zealand